Sphaeropoeus hercules is a species of giant pill millipede belonging to the family Zephroniidae.

Distribution
This species can be found in Sumatra.

Bibliography
 Pocock, Reginald Innes (1894) Chilopoda, Symphyla and Diplopoda from the Malay Archipelago, In: Weber, M.: Zoologische Ergebnisse einer Reise in Niederländisch Ost-Indien, Band 3: 307-404.
 Jeekel, Casimir Albrecht Willem (2001) A bibliographic catalogue of the Asiatic Sphaerotheriida (Diplopoda), Myriapod memoranda, 3: 5-38: 5-38.
 Jeekel, Casimir Albrecht Willem (1971) Nomenclator generum et familiarum Diplopodorum: A list of the genus and family-group names in the Class Diplopoda from the 10th edition of Linnaeus, 1758, to the end of 1957, Monografieen van de Nederlandse Entomologische Vereniging, 5: 1-412: 1-412.
 SysMyr: Systematic Myriapod Database. Spelda J., 2008-12-29

References

Sphaerotheriida
Millipedes of Asia
Fauna of Sumatra
Zephroniidae